Bananafish or banana fish may refer to:

 "A Perfect Day for Bananafish", a short story by J. D. Salinger
 Banana Fish, a manga series by Akimi Yoshida
 Bananafish Magazine, an underground culture magazine

Music
 "Bananafishbones", a song by The Cure from The Top
 "Bananafish no Hamabe to Kuroi Niji", a song by Galileo Galilei from See More Glass
 "Banana Fish", a song by Shonen Knife from Burning Farm

Species
 Albula neoguinaica and Albula vulpes, two species of bonefishes
 Double-lined fusilier, or banana fish
 Elops hawaiensis, or banana fish
 Elops machnata, or banana fish
 Horseface loach, or banana-root fish
 Pterocaesio pisang, or banana fusilier